The Boy in the Striped Pyjamas is a 2006 Holocaust novel by Irish novelist John Boyne. The plot concerns a German boy named Bruno whose father is the commandant of Auschwitz and Bruno's friendship with a Jewish detainee named Shmuel.

Boyne wrote the entire first draft in two and a half days, without sleeping much; but also said that he was quite a serious student of Holocaust-related literature for years before the idea for the novel even came to him.

The book has received mixed reviews; positive reviews have praised the story as a morality tale. It has been criticized by scholars and historians of the Holocaust as well as memorial organizations. Negative reviews have noted the book's historical inconsistencies, and the potential damage it could cause to people's Holocaust education.

In both 2007 and 2008, it was the best-selling book of the year in Spain, and it reached number one on the New York Times bestseller list. The book was adapted into a film of the same name in 2008, a ballet in 2017 and an opera entitled A Child In Striped Pyjamas in 2023. It was followed by a sequel, All the Broken Places, which was published in 2022.

Background 
John Boyne has described the conception of his novel as an idea popping into his head of "two boys, the mirror of each other, sitting either side of a wire fence". While the conception of the book came about fast, his inspiration for writing has a more lengthy foundation. Boyne has stated that his style and writing process has been influenced by Malcolm Bradbury at the University of East Anglia, who suggested he write every day without rest days.

Unlike other novels he has written, Boyne has described how he wrote the first draft of The Boy in the Striped Pyjamas in roughly two and a half days, with the idea for the novel coming to him on Tuesday, 27 April, then wrote non-stop until Friday at noon. Afterwards, he ended up writing ten different drafts before sending his book to the editor. As for the subject material and research that Boyne undertook to write the book, Professor Gerd Bayer from the University of Erlangen has stated that Boyne's reader should not rely on "the actual truth-value of his text".

Plot
Bruno is a nine-year-old boy growing up during World War II in Berlin. He lives with his parents, his twelve-year-old sister Gretel whom he has nicknamed 'A Hopeless Case', and maids, one of whom is named Maria and another is a Jewish chef named Pavel. After a visit by Adolf Hitler, whose title The Führer Bruno commonly mispronounces as "Fury", Bruno's father Ralf is promoted to Commandant of the death camp Auschwitz, which Bruno mispronounces as "Out-With".

Bruno is initially upset about having to move to Auschwitz and is almost in tears at the prospect of leaving his 'best friends for life', Daniel, Karl, and Martin. From the house at Auschwitz, Bruno sees the camp in which the prisoners' uniforms appear to him to be "striped pyjamas". One day Bruno decides to explore the wire fence surrounding the camp. He meets a Jewish boy, Shmuel, who he learns shares his birthday (April 15) and age. Shmuel says that his father, grandfather, and brother are with him on his side of the fence, but he is separated from his mother. Bruno and Shmuel talk and become very good friends although Bruno still does not understand very much about Shmuel or his life. Nearly every day, unless it is raining, Bruno goes to see Shmuel and sneaks him food. Over time, Bruno notices that Shmuel is rapidly losing weight.

Bruno concocts a plan with Shmuel to sneak into the camp to look for Shmuel's father, who has gone missing. Shmuel brings a set of prison clothes and Bruno leaves his own clothes outside the fence. As they search the camp they are captured, added to a group of prisoners on a "march", and led into a gas chamber, which Bruno assumes is simply a rain shelter. In the gas chamber, Bruno apologizes to Shmuel for not finding his father and tells Shmuel that he is his best friend for life. It is not made clear if Shmuel answers before the doors close and the lights go out, although Bruno determines to never let go of Shmuel's hand.

Bruno is never seen again, his clothes being discovered by a soldier days later. His mother, Elsa, spends months searching for him, even returning to their old home, before at last moving back to Berlin with Gretel, who isolates herself in her room. Ralf spends a year more at Auschwitz, becoming ruthless and cold to his subordinates. A year later, he returns to the place where Bruno's clothes were found, deduces how his son disappeared and collapses to his knees in grief. Months later, Allied troops liberate the camp and Ralf, wracked with guilt and self-loathing, allows himself to be taken prisoner without resistance.

The book ends with the phrase "Of course, all of this happened a long time ago and nothing like that could ever happen again. Not in this day and age".

Genre and style 
The Boy in The Striped Pyjamas fits into the genre of Holocaust fiction. Boyne uses general knowledge about the Holocaust to create a self-described "fable", that relies more on a story of moral truth than historical accuracy. This type of literature, as shown in The Boy in the Striped Pyjamas, tends to be told to children, from a child's perspective. By having one child share the "bitter herbs" of history with another, the novel instills moral obligation in children.

Kenneth Kidd, professor of English at the University of Florida, argues that John Boyne's use of fable allows him to explore the darker elements of the Holocaust with more of a cautionary tale resulting.

Analysis 
Sophie Melissa Smith, a PhD candidate at the University of Southampton, argues that writing a factual story as a fable is damaging as it may produce misconceptions about the Holocaust. Examples include the ability of Shmuel to escape work and Bruno's ability to approach an electrified fence.

Smith claims that Boyne lowers the culpability of Nazis like Bruno's father by not just humanizing them but also creating a sense of obligation in characters like Bruno's father, as Bruno's father was a Commandant at a large concentration camp.  Additionally, the depiction of the story told through Bruno creates a greater ignorance of the Nazi regime by using words such as "the Fury" in place of the Fuhrer and "Out-with" in place of Auschwitz. Generally, critics see the trivialization of the Nazi regime in this portrayal as damaging to Holocaust education.

Educational implications 
A 2009 study by the London Jewish Cultural Centre conducted a survey in which 75% of respondents thought Boyne's novel was based on a true story. Many students also thought "the tragic death of Bruno brought about the end of concentration camps."

Michael Gray, Director of Studies at Harrow School and author of Contemporary Debates in Holocaust Education and Teaching the Holocaust: Practical Approaches for Ages 11-18, described the book in 2014 as "a curse for Holocaust education."

Criticising the book's accuracy, the Auschwitz-Birkenau State Museum commented in 2020 that the novel "should be avoided by anyone who studies or teaches about the Holocaust."  The Melbourne Holocaust Museum, while finding the book a powerful introduction to the subject, cautions teachers regarding its many inaccuracies.

Following on from their research in 2016, that suggested that pupils reach mistaken and/or misleading conclusions about the Holocaust from the book, The UCL Centre for Holocaust Education's 2020 research found that 35% of teachers in England conducting lessons on the Holocaust use it, or the film.

In response to Noah Max's operatic adaptation of the book, Professor Nathan Abrams wrote that "it is a very tricky task to translate the magnitude of the Holocaust to a younger audience. Any device, however flawed, should be applauded for attempting to do so even if it does not fully succeed. It is the task of the reader to go and learn more to put the novel in context."

Reception
Kathryn Hughes, writing in The Guardian, calls the novel "a small wonder of a book." She takes issue with the laxness of Auschwitz and describes the novel as "something that borders on fable," arguing that "Bruno's innocence comes to stand for the willful refusal of all adult Germans to see what was going on under their noses."

Nicholas Tucker, writing in The Independent, calls the novel "a fine addition to a once taboo area of history, at least where children's literature is concerned." He asserts that it is a good depiction of a tragic event that strays away from graphic details, with the exception of the "killer punch" at the end of the novel.

Ed Wright, writing in The Age of Melbourne, calls the novel "a touching tale of an odd friendship between two boys in horrendous circumstances and a reminder of man's capacity for inhumanity." He felt that the depiction of Bruno and Shmuel's friendship was  a classic childhood friendship with a naïvety of their surroundings. He concludes by observing that "The Boy in the Striped Pyjamas is subtitled A Fable", and sets out to create a moral story of human nature in a fable format.

A. O. Scott, writing in The New York Times, questioned the author and publisher's choice to intentionally keep the Holocaust setting of the book vague in both the dust jacket summary and the early portion of the novel. Scott described how the experiences of the characters were supposed to be represented as separate from the setting of the Holocaust, and this creates a lack of the informative nature seen in other novels of Holocaust literature such as Night by Elie Wiesel.  Scott claims that "there is something awkward about the way Boyne manages to disguise, and then to disclose, the historical context." Scott concludes that "to mold the Holocaust into an allegory, as Boyne does here with perfectly benign intent, is to step away from its reality."

Rabbi Benjamin Blech offered a historical criticism, contending that the premise of the book and subsequent film – that there could be a child of Shmuel's age in Auschwitz – was impossible, writing of the book: "Note to the reader: there were no 9-year-old Jewish boys in Auschwitz – the Nazis immediately gassed those not old enough to work." Rabbi Blech affirmed the opinion of a Holocaust survivor friend that the book is "not just a lie and not just a fairytale, but a profanation." Students who read it, he warns, may believe the camps "weren't that bad" if a boy could conduct a clandestine friendship with a Jewish captive of the same age, unaware of "the constant presence of death."

Holocaust scholar Henry Gonshak rebuts Blech's historical contention in his book, Hollywood and the Holocaust. He writes that "the rabbi found implausible Shmuel's very existence in the camp," but states that "Blech is factually incorrect." While there were no female children, records have shown that in 1944 "there were 619 male children at the camp, ranging in age from one month to fourteen years old."

Gonshak acknowledges that this presence of children does not take away from the thousands who were killed in the gas chambers.

In other media 
In 2008, two years after being published, the novel was made into a movie The Boy in the Striped Pyjamas, directed by Mark Herman.

In 2017, the novel was adapted into a ballet by the Northern Ballet. The score is produced by Gary Yershon. Reviews of the ballet are generally negative with Zo and Euml Anderson of The Independent stating the casting of children's parts as adults works against "the naivety of a child's viewpoint," which the novel captures. The Yorkshire Posts review described the score as "a relentless assault on the ears," but apart from the music, it stated that it has redeemable quality in the cast, despite being depressing.

In 2023 the novel was adapted into an opera entitled A Child In Striped Pyjamas by Noah Max. He says of Boyne's book: "It's very hard to convince children to read a book about something as dark and serious as the Holocaust and what I find amazing is that while not all adults get the profound symbolism of the story, kids get it. They pick up on the fact that the children have the same birthday and are the same child." On the appropriateness of depicting the Holocaust through opera, Max says: "the only way to convey its magnitude - and in such a way that people understood it was symbolic and not real - was through opera." The piece was positively received by critics. Barry Millington gave A Child In Striped Pyjamas four stars in the London Evening Standard, describing the work as "intense, harrowing drama... [which] invites universal grief". In The Telegraph Sir Nicholas Kenyon wrote that the piece was "emotionally ambitious... vocally eloquent... there can be no doubt of the integrity with which the tight-knit company deliver it."

References

Further reading

2006 Irish novels
Irish historical novels
Irish novels adapted into films
Novels adapted into ballets
Novels set in Germany
Novels set in Poland
Novels set in the 1940s
Novels about the Holocaust
Novels by John Boyne
David Fickling Books books